Abbeyleix is a town in County Laois, Ireland, located around  south of the county town of Portlaoise.

Abbeyleix was formerly located on the N8, the main road from Dublin to Cork. At one point, up to 15,000 vehicles passed along the town's main street every day. Since May 2010, however, the town has been bypassed by the M8 motorway, with the former N8 consequently downgraded to the N77 national secondary road, and R639 regional road.

History 
There was a settlement at Abbeyleix as early as 1183, that grew up near the River Nore, around a Cistercian monastery - which gives the town its name. 

Modern Abbeyleix is one of the oldest planned estate towns in Ireland. It was largely built in the 18th century by Viscount de Vesci. The regular flooding of the River Nore made the town an unhealthy place to live. Around 1790, John Vesey determined that the location of the town was not suitable for his tenants, and began to design a new one. The old town was levelled, and the residents moved to the new one.  A memorial to the 2nd Viscount de Vesci, paid for by subscriptions, is in the town center. It features a water trough for horses.

Today, there are many historical structures standing in and around the town - ancient ring forts, burial grounds, churches and estate houses. The town once had a carpet factory, established in 1904 by Yvo de Vesci, the 5th Viscount – notably producing some of the carpets used on the RMS Olympic and RMS Titanic.

The Abbeyleix Heritage House is a local heritage centre, with visitor information and an exhibition on the county's history and local attractions. Original antique carpets and vintage costumes are on display alongside archaeological and historical artefacts.

Transport

Road 
The N8 road to Cork passed through Abbeyleix prior to the opening of the M8 motorway in 2010. With the opening of the M8 the N77 road was extended along the route of the former N8 from Durrow to Portlaoise. Access to the M8 from Abbeyleix is also provided via the R433 road.

Rail 
Abbeyleix railway station, on the line from Portlaoise to Kilkenny, opened on 1 March 1865 and closed on 1 January 1963.

Bus 
Bus Éireann's expressway service between Dublin and Cork ceased to serve Abbeyleix on 30 June 2012. As an interim measure until 11 August 2012 Bus Éireann operated a shuttle service (route 128) to connect with Expressway services at Portlaoise. Slieve Bloom Coaches also have a route from Borris-in-Ossory to Portlaoise which serves the town.

Amenities 
There is a district hospital in the town, and a number of shops and pubs. Father Breen Park has fields for soccer and other sports, while the adjacent CYMS hall is home to a number of clubs. Heritage House also provides guided tours of the museum and runs workshops throughout the year. The Abbeyleix Manor Hotel is part of the Magnuson Hotels chain.

The "Lords Walk Loop" is a 2.4 kilometer loop that traces an old walking route taken by the De Vesci Family to reach the local church and railway station.

Buildings of note 

Abbeyleix House and the de Vesci estate (Abbeyleix Estate) is located on the Ballacolla road. As of 2019, the estate was being marketed for sale, with an asking price of €20 million.

Within the town, Abbeyleix Market House is a five-bay, four storey building which was previously used as a fire station and library. It has been renovated as a library and exhibition centre. Heritage House is a visitor centre which houses a local history museum. This 19th-century building was once the North Boys School. Both the Market House and Heritage House are listed on the Record of Protected Structures for County Laois.

Sport 
Abbeyleix GAA club is the local Gaelic Athletic Association club. Abbeyleix Golf Club and Abbeyleix Lawn Tennis Club were established in 1895 and 1909 respectively. Other sports clubs in the area include a hockey club and soccer (association football) club.

Notable residents 
 Sarah "Venie" Barr, (1875 – 1947) political and community activist 
 Launt Thompson (1833–1894), sculptor.
 Sir Edward Massey (1619–1674), English soldier and parliamentarian
 Francis Bacon (1909–1992), artist

See also 
 List of towns and villages in Ireland
 Market Houses in Ireland

References

External links 

 Abbeyleix Irish Heritage Towns
 Abbeyleix.ie
 Abbeyleix Bog
 Abbeyleix Further Ed. Centre
 Abbeyleix Tidy Towns

Towns and villages in County Laois
Townlands of County Laois
Planned communities in the Republic of Ireland